is a Japanese football player currently playing for Kyoto Sanga FC.

National team career
In October 2009, Miyayoshi was elected Japan U-17 national team for 2009 U-17 World Cup. He played 2 matches and scored 2 goals against Switzerland.

Career statistics

Club
Updated to 21 July 2022.

1Includes Emperor's Cup.
2Includes J. League Cup.
3Includes AFC Champions League.

International goals
Scores and results list Japan's goal tally first.

Under-17

Appearances in major competitions

References

External links
Profile at Consadole Sapporo 
Profile at Sanfrecce Hiroshima 
Profile at Kyoto Sanga 

1992 births
Living people
Association football people from Shiga Prefecture
Japanese footballers
Japan youth international footballers
J1 League players
J2 League players
Kyoto Sanga FC players
Kataller Toyama players
Sanfrecce Hiroshima players
Hokkaido Consadole Sapporo players
Association football forwards